Hyman Lurie (1918-1982) was a male English international table tennis player.

Table tennis career
He won a bronze medal at the 1938 World Table Tennis Championships in the men's doubles with Eric Filby. One year later he won double bronze at the 1939 World Table Tennis Championships by partnering Ken Hyde in a men's doubles and being part of the men's team, in the Swaythling Cup with Ken Hyde, Ernest Bubley, Ken Stanley and Arthur Wilmott.

Personal life
Hyman ran his father's Barber Shop on Elizabeth Street in Manchester. The shop was opened by Israel Lurie and it was the first to serve ladies in Manchester. He was Jewish.

See also
 List of England players at the World Team Table Tennis Championships
 List of World Table Tennis Championships medalists

References

English male table tennis players
1918 births
1982 deaths
World Table Tennis Championships medalists